NGC 90 is an interacting spiral galaxy estimated to be about 300 million light-years away in the constellation of Andromeda. It was discovered by R. J. Mitchell in 1854 and its apparent magnitude is 13.7. The galaxy is currently interacting with NGC 93 and exhibits two highly elongated and distorted spiral arms with bright blue star clusters indicative of star formation, likely caused by the interaction with its neighbor.

NGC 90 and NGC 93 form the interacting galaxy pair Arp 65.

References

0090
Andromeda (constellation)
18541026
065